Mediacorp Channel 8's television series Home Truly is a family-drama series produced by Mediacorp Studios in 2016, starring Zhang Zhenhuan, Pierre Png, Somaline Ang, Chen Shucheng, Hong Huifang, Rayson Tan, Cavin Soh, Priscelia Chan, Chen Meixin, Adele Wong and Li Wenhai.

The show aired on Mediacorp Channel 8 from 10 January 2017 with 20 episodes.

Episodes

See also
List of MediaCorp Channel 8 Chinese Drama Series (2010s)
Home Truly

Lists of Singaporean television series episodes